Cumpston is a surname. Notable people with the surname include: 

Gladys Maeva Cumpston (1887–1975), Australia community worker
Hal Cumpston, Australian actor, producer and writer
James M. Cumpston (1837–1888), American Union Army soldier
Jeremy Cumpston (born 1967), Australian actor and director
John Cumpston (1890–1954), Australian public servant
Louis Bowser Cumpston (1865–1931), British architect
Nici Cumpston (born 1963), Australian photographer